Casino Kid is a casino video game for the Nintendo Entertainment System released in 1989. It was developed and published by Sofel.

Gameplay
Casino Kid takes place in a fictional Las Vegas (the Japanese version uses the actual city of Las Vegas, Nevada) where the object is to earn much money and to defeat the evil King of the Casino. Games at the casino include blackjack and five-card draw poker. Slot machines and roulette were omitted from the North American version. While the North American version uses a parody name for the Las Vegas casino, the Japanese version uses the actual Golden Nugget name.

In the Japanese version, it is possible to travel to other casinos like New York City and Japan for a substantial airfare cost. Players can essentially customize the game in the Japanese version by placing in their own name. Casino Kid has blue hair in the Japanese version and blond hair in the North American version.  A "free mode" is added into the Japanese version that allow for experimentation with gambling strategies.

There is a different introduction in the North American and Japanese version. The Japanese version has a kid imagining himself to be the casino champion while the North American version has the player compete in a tournament for the world's toughest gamblers. Both versions have waitresses in bunny costumes that gives hints to the player. Attempting to skip an opponent allow players to find the exact location of the previous opponent while skipping two or more opponents is frowned upon in this game.

Legacy

Casino Kid II is the sequel to Casino Kid, released in North America in April 1993 by the same company. The sequel was originally going to be titled The Prince of Othello and given a 1990 release until Sofel decided to temporarily cancel the project.

In Casino Kid II, the titular protagonist, after having defeated the top players in Las Vegas, is issued a challenge by the top gamblers around the world. The matches are organized by a mysterious leader, and to unveil the leader, the Casino Kid must defeat nine opponents from around the world in the games of roulette, poker, and blackjack. There is a story sequence that is more elaborate than in Casino Kid. Gameplay in Casino Kid II differs in that players no longer venture around the casino looking for rival gamblers, though the card games still operate in the same fashion as in the original Casino Kid. Players travel by plane to each destination either in the daytime or in the night; depending on which country that he is flying to.

Unlike Casino Kid, Casino Kid II was never released in Japan. The game is probably most well known for its music done by the EIM sound team of Kenji Eno and Michiya Hirasawa (both now deceased).

References

External links
 Casino Kid on GameSpot
 
 

1989 video games
1993 video games
Casino video games
Nintendo Entertainment System games
Nintendo Entertainment System-only games
SOFEL games
Video games based on anime and manga
Video games developed in Japan
Video games set in the Las Vegas Valley
Video games set in Nevada